The Intha (also spelt Innthar) are members of a Tibeto-Burman ethnic group living around Inle Lake. There are around 100,000 to 200,000 Intha.

Origins 
The origins of the Intha are disputed; the Intha believe their ancestors arrived from the southern tip of modern-day Myanmar (Tanintharyi Region). A commonly held theory is that the Intha fled from southern Myanmar during the 14th century; the ruling Shan saophas forbade them from settling on the land, which forced the Intha to instead settle on Inle Lake. To this day, the Intha primarily live in four cities bordering the lake, in numerous small villages along the lake's shores, and on the lake itself. The entire lake area is in Nyaung Shwe township.

Language 

The Intha speak a divergent dialect of Burmese. Colonial observers noted that the Intha spoke a language resembling Burmese, with a Shan accent. Unlike other dialects of Burmese, the Intha language does not exhibit voicing sandhi, similar to the Danu and Taungyo languages.

Culture 
Intha are overwhelmingly Buddhists and live in simple houses of wood and woven bamboo on stilts; they are largely self-sufficient farmers. The Intha support themselves through the tending of vegetable farms on floating gardens.

Traditional Intha attire consists of a pink-colored short sleeved jacket and loose trousers for men. During the pre-colonial era, Intha women wore tailored cotton jackets called "chin in" over a penny cloth white upper garment, and a satin and silk htamein decorated in alternating shades of light and dark pink stripes and waves. The Intha village of Ywama is home to an indigenous type of longyi called "hat yar," which is sewn with silk and cotton fabric in varying brown and yellow stripes.

Intha cuisine is known for its diversity of bitter soups called saykha hin (ဆေးခါးဟင်း). The traditional beverage of choice, brewed green tea, is served with salt. Traditional meals consist of cooked rice and an array of curries served in a daunglan.

Traditional Intha dances include the lansi, lunsi, and ozigyi dances. Poem recitation traditions called taiktay, in which Intha bachelors and maidens recite poetry.

The Intha are also well known for their unusual leg-rowing techniques. Most transportation on the lake is traditionally by small boats, or by somewhat larger boats fitted with 'long-tail' motors that are necessary because of the usual shallowness of the lake. Local fishermen are known for practicing a distinctive rowing style which involves standing at the stern on one leg and wrapping the other leg around the oar. This unique style evolved for the reason that the lake is covered by reeds and floating plants making it difficult to see above them while sitting. Standing provides the rower with a view beyond the reeds. However, the leg rowing style is only practiced by the men. Women row in the customary style, using the oar with their hands, sitting cross legged at the stern.

References

Ethnic groups in Myanmar
Buddhist communities of Myanmar
Sino-Tibetan-speaking people